Vixens, known in Japan as , is a Hentai manga by U-jin published by Cybele publishing in June 1994, the OVA series was released on August 25, 1995, to April 21,1996 It contains three episodes and contains the use of BDSM and Omorashi.

Episodes

Further reading
 "Visionary", pg 733, The anime encyclopedia: a guide to Japanese animation since 1917, McCarthy & Clement 2007

References

External links
 
 
 http://www.mania.com/vixens_article_75649.html
 http://games.monstersatplay.com/review/anime/vixens.php

1994 manga
1995 anime OVAs
Anime 18
Hentai anime and manga
BDSM literature